Dungannon Middle (named after Dungannon town) is a barony in County Tyrone, Northern Ireland. It was created in 1851 with the splitting of the barony of Dungannon. It is bordered by Lough Neagh to the east and six other baronies: Dungannon Upper to the north; Oneilland West to the south-east; Armagh and Tiranny to the south; Dungannon Lower to the south-west; and Omagh East to the west.

List of main settlements
 Castlecaulfield
 Coalisland
 Donaghmore
 Dungannon
 Moy
 Moygashel
 Pomeroy
 Stewartstown

List of civil parishes
Below is a list of civil parishes in Dungannon Middle:
Clonfeacle (split with baronies of Dungannon Lower, Armagh and Oneilland West)
Clonoe
Donaghenry
Donaghmore
Drumglass
Killyman (split with barony of Oneilland West)
Pomeroy
Tullyniskan

References

 
1851 establishments in Ireland